Robert Joseph Connelly (April 4, 1909 – July 5, 1922) was an American child actor of silent films. He is one of the first male child stars of American motion pictures beginning his career in 1913 at the age of four.

Career
Connelly's parents were vaudeville performers and young Connelly began in films with the Kalem company. His sister Helen also had a career as a child actress. In 1914 Connelly switched to Vitagraph Studios, which were based primarily in New York and New Jersey, close to where Connelly and his family lived. He appeared in films with major players of the day and in 1914–15 portrayed "Sonny Jim" in a series of shorts about the adventures of a young boy.

In 1917, he got his own series of films with his name in the title to emphasize his star billing. His career pertains primarily with the Vitagraph studios but occasionally he would appear in other studios' productions such as Humoresque produced by Paramount Pictures in 1920. Humoresque, a story by Fannie Hurst was a huge hit in 1920 and is one of Connelly's few films to survive.

On stage, Connelly acted in Man and Wife at Proctor's Theater in Yonkers, New York.

Death
In 1917, Connelly was diagnosed with endocarditis. Nevertheless, he was still allowed to keep a heavy work schedule. In 1922, Connelly became ill after completing work on the film Wildness of Youth. He died of bronchitis at his home on July 5, 1922, at the age of 13.

Selected filmography
Salvation Joan (1916)
The Suspect (1916)
A Prince in a Pawnshop (1916)
Her Right to Live (1917)
Beyond the Law (1918)
Out of a Clear Sky (1918)
The Road Through the Dark (1918)
The Unpardonable Sin (1919)
A Child for Sale (1920)
The Flapper (1920)
Humoresque (1920)
 Other Men's Shoes (1920)
 A Wide Open Town (1922)

References

Bibliography
 Holmstrom, John. The Moving Picture Boy: An International Encyclopaedia from 1895 to 1995, Norwich, Michael Russell, 1996, p. 39.

External links

 
 

1909 births
1922 deaths
Male actors from New York (state)
American male child actors
American male film actors
American male silent film actors
Deaths from bronchitis
People from Brooklyn
20th-century American male actors
People from Lynbrook, New York